Mario Revollo Bravo (19 September 1919 - 3 November 1995) was a Colombian prelate of the Catholic Church who was archbishop of Bogotá from 1984 to 1994. He was made a cardinal in 1988.

Biography

Mario Revollo Bravo was born in Genoa, Italy, where his father was Colombian consul in that city. He was the third of the six children. He was ordained 31 October 1943 in Rome by Cardinal Luigi Traglia.

Pope Paul VI appointed him an auxiliary bishop of Bogotá on 13 November 1973. He was elected president of the Episcopal Conference of Colombia in 1978 and held that position until Pope John Paul II transferred him to the metropolitan see of Bogotá on 25 June 1984.

Pope John Paul II made Revollo Bravo Cardinal-Priest of San Bartolomeo all'Isola in the consistory of 1988. He retired as archbishop in 1994. He died on 3 November 1995.

References

External links
 Database of Catholic Information

1919 births
1995 deaths
Roman Catholic archbishops of Bogotá
20th-century Roman Catholic archbishops in Colombia
Colombian cardinals
Cardinals created by Pope John Paul II
Italian emigrants to Colombia
Major Seminary of Bogotá alumni
Roman Catholic bishops of Bogotá
Roman Catholic archbishops of Nueva Pamplona